This is a list of members of the Western Australian Legislative Council from 22 May 1948 to 21 May 1950. The chamber had 30 seats made up of ten provinces each electing three members, on a system of rotation whereby one-third of the members would retire at each biennial election.

Sources
 
 
 

Members of Western Australian parliaments by term